Commemorative coins have been issued by the Royal Mint in the United Kingdom since 1935. Initially they only came out to mark events of great interest, but since the turn of the millennium have been minted yearly.

Until decimalisation crowns (five shilling coins) were used for this purpose as they were the highest denomination of the time, but due to inflation this role has been transferred to higher value coins.

Crowns, £5 coins and (until 1996) £2 coins are non-circulating, although they are still legal tender. These denominations are only used for commemoratives. During the decimal era, crowns were converted to twenty-five pence.

50p and £2 coins made after 1996 circulate normally and can be found in change. Usually about 5 million of each of these are the commemorative issue, the rest being of the standard design.

Since 1982 all of these have also been produced as sterling silver and 22 carat gold proofs.

Although the design of the old round £1 coin changed every year, these are not considered to be commemoratives, as they do not mark an event or its anniversary.

Crowns 

 1935: Silver Jubilee of George V
 1937: Coronation of George VI
 1951: Festival of Britain
 1953: Coronation of The Queen
 1960: British Trade Fair in New York City
 1965: Death of Winston Churchill, former Prime Minister

Twenty-five pence 

 1972: Silver Wedding of The Queen and The Duke of Edinburgh
 1977: Silver Jubilee of Elizabeth II
 1980: Queen Elizabeth The Queen Mother's 80th Birthday.
 1981: Wedding of Charles, Prince of Wales and Lady Diana Spencer

Five pounds 

 1990: Queen Elizabeth The Queen Mother's 90th Birthday
 1993: 40th Anniversary of Coronation of The Queen
 1996: The Queen's 70th Birthday
 1997: Golden Wedding of The Queen and The Duke of Edinburgh
 1998: The Prince of Wales' 50th Birthday
 1999: Diana, Princess of Wales Memorial
 1999/2000: Millennium
 2000: Queen Elizabeth The Queen Mother's 100th Birthday
 2001: Queen Victoria Centenary of death
 2002: Golden Jubilee of Elizabeth II
 2002: Queen Elizabeth The Queen Mother Memorial
 2003: 50th Anniversary of Coronation of The Queen
 2004: Entente Cordiale Centenary (Peace treaty between Britain and France)
 2005: Bicentenary of Battle of Trafalgar and Admiral Lord Nelson (2 coins)
 2006: 80th Birthday of The Queen
 2007: Diamond Wedding of The Queen and The Duke of Edinburgh
 2008: 60th Birthday of The Prince of Wales.
 2008: 450th anniversary of the accession of Elizabeth I.
 2009: The 500th anniversary of the accession of Henry VIII.
 2009: Three years until the 2012 London Olympics, swimming 
 2010: 350th anniversary of the restoration of the monarchy under Charles II
 2010: Two years until the 2012 London Olympic Games, athletics 
 2011: The 90th birthday of The Duke of Edinburgh
 2011: Wedding of Prince William and Catherine Middleton
 2011: One Year until the 2012 London Olympic and Paralympic games, cycling
 2012: Diamond Jubilee of Queen Elizabeth II
 2012: London 2012 Olympics
 2012: London 2012 Paralympics
 2013: 60th Anniversary of the Queen's Coronation
 2013: The Royal Christening of HRH Prince George of Cambridge
 2014: The 300th Anniversary of the Death of Queen Anne
 2015: The 50th anniversary of the death of Sir Winston Churchill
 2015: The 200th Anniversary of the Battle of Waterloo
 2015: The Royal Birth of HRH Princess Charlotte of Cambridge
 2015: Longest reigning monarch - Queen Elizabeth II
 2016: 90th birthday of Queen Elizabeth II
 2017: Sapphire Jubilee of Queen Elizabeth II
 2017: Remembrance Day
 2017: Platinum Wedding (70 years) of Queen Elizabeth II and Prince Philip, The Duke of Edinburgh
 2017: Prince Philip 70 years of service
 2017: Centenary of the House of Windsor
 2017: 1000th anniversary of the coronation of King Canute
 2017: The Queen's Beasts series - Lion of England (Re-released with 2018 date to celebrate England's success in the World Cup)
 2017: The Queen's Beasts series - Unicorn of Scotland
 2017: Christmas
 2018: Sapphire anniversary of the Queen's coronation
 2018: Wedding of Prince Harry and Meghan Markle
 2018: 250th anniversary of the founding of the Royal Academy of Arts
 2018: Four generations of the Royal Family
 2018: The Queen's Beasts series - Red Dragon of Wales
 2018: The Queen's Beasts series - Black Bull of Clarence
 2018: 5th birthday of Prince George of Cambridge
 2020: 200th anniversary of the death of King George III
 2021: Death of Prince Philip, Duke of Edinburgh
 2022: Platinum Jubilee of Elizabeth II
 2022: Death of Elizabeth II
 2022: 100th anniversary of the Discovery of Tutankhamun's tomb
 2023: 75th birthday of King Charles III

Fifty pence

Circulating 
 1973: UK's entry into the European Economic Community
 1992: UK's Presidency of the EU Council of Ministers and the completion of the European single market
 1994: 50th anniversary of D-Day
 1998: 25th anniversary of the UK's membership in the European Union
 1998: 50th anniversary of the NHS
 2000: 150th anniversary of the Public Libraries Act 1850
 2003: 100th anniversary of the Women's Social and Political Union (the Suffragettes)
 2004: 50th anniversary of the first four-minute mile by Roger Bannister
 2005: 250th anniversary of the publication of the first English Dictionary
 2006: 150th anniversary of the Victoria Cross (2 coins)
 2007: 100th anniversary of the Scout Movement
 2009: 250th anniversary of the Royal Botanical Gardens at Kew
 2010: 100th anniversary of Girlguiding UK
 2011: 50th anniversary of the World Wildlife Fund
 2011: 2012 Summer Olympics and Paralympics in London (a set of 29 coins of different sports)
 2013: 100th anniversary of the birth of Christopher Ironside
 2013: 100th anniversary of the birth of Benjamin Britten
 2014: XX Commonwealth Games in Glasgow
 2015: 75th anniversary of the Battle of Britain
 2016: 950th anniversary of the Battle of Hastings
 2016: 150th anniversary of the birth of Beatrix Potter (1st series) - Beatrix Potter, Peter Rabbit, Mrs Tiggy-Winkle, Jemima Puddle-Duck, Squirrel Nutkin
 2016: Team GB at the Rio Olympics
 2017: Beatrix Potter (2nd series) - Benjamin Bunny, Mr. Jeremy Fisher, Tom Kitten, The Tale of Peter Rabbit
 2017: Sir Isaac Newton
 2018: Beatrix Potter (3rd series) - Peter Rabbit, Flopsy Bunny, Mrs. Tittlemouse, The Tailor of Gloucester
 2018: 100th anniversary of the Representation of the People Act
 2018: 60th anniversary of Paddington Bear (1st series) - at Paddington Station and at Buckingham Palace
 2019: Sherlock Holmes
 2019: Paddington Bear (2nd series) - at the Tower of London and at St Paul's Cathedral 
 2020: Britain's withdrawal from the European Union
 2020: Celebrating British Diversity
 2022: Platinum Jubilee of Elizabeth II
 2022: 50th anniversary of Pride UK
 2022: Death of Elizabeth II

Non-circulating 
 2018: 40th anniversary of The Snowman (1st coin)
 2019: Fifty Years of the Fifty Pence - British Culture set
 2019: Fifty Years of the Fifty Pence - British Military Set
 2019: 20th anniversary of The Gruffalo (2 coins) - The Gruffalo and The Gruffalo & Mouse
 2019: Innovation in Science set (1st coin) - Stephen Hawking
 2019: Beatrix Potter (4th series) - Peter Rabbit
 2019: 30th anniversary of A Grand Day Out (Wallace and Gromit)
 2019: The Snowman (2nd coin)
 2020: The Dinosauria Collection (Tales of the Earth) - Megalosaurus, Iguanodon, Hylaeosaurus
 2020: Beatrix Potter (5th series) - Peter Rabbit
 2020: Innovation in Science set (2nd coin) - 100th anniversary of the birth of Rosalind Franklin
 2020: Winnie The Pooh & Friends (1st series) - Winnie-the-Pooh, Christopher Robin, Piglet
 2020: The Snowman (3rd coin)
 2020-2021: Team GB at the Tokyo Olympics
 2021: 50th anniversary of Decimal Day
 2021: Innovation in Science set (3rd coin) - 75th anniversary of the death of John Logie Baird
 2021: The Dinosauria Collection (The Mary Anning collection) - Temnodontosaurus, Plesiosaurus, Dimorphodon
 2021: Winnie The Pooh & Friends (2nd series) - Winnie-the-Pooh, Owl, Tigger
 2021: Innovation in Science set (4th coin) - 150th anniversary of the death of Charles Babbage
 2021: Innovation in Science set (5th coin) - 100th anniversary of the discovery of Insulin
 2021: The Snowman (4th coin)
 2022: Platinum Jubilee of Elizabeth II (alternate obverse)
 2022: 2022 Commonwealth Games (5 coins - 4 colourised, one each for England, Scotland, Wales and Northern Ireland)
 2022: 50th anniversary of Pride UK (colourised reverse)
 2022: Innovation in Science set (6th coin) - Alan Turing
 2022: Winnie The Pooh & Friends (3rd series) -  Eeyore, Kanga & Roo
 2022: 100th anniversary of the BBC
 2022: 25th anniversary of Harry Potter
 2022: 10th anniversary of The Snowman and the Snowdog (5th coin)
 2023: 75th anniversary of the Windrush Generation
 2023: 75th anniversary of the NHS

Two pounds

Single metal

Non-circulating 
 1986: XIII Commonwealth Games in Edinburgh
 1989: 300th anniversary of the Bill of Rights 1689
 1989: 300th anniversary of the Claim of Right Act 1689
 1994: 300th anniversary of Bank of England
 1995: 50th anniversary of the end of the Second World War
 1995: 50th anniversary of the United Nations
 1996: UEFA Euro in England

Bimetallic

Circulating 
 1999: Rugby World Cup in Wales
 2001: 100th anniversary of the first successful trans-Atlantic wireless transmission
 2002: XVII Commonwealth Games in Manchester (4 coins) - England, Wales, Scotland and Northern Ireland
 2003: 50th anniversary of the discovery of the structure of DNA
 2004: 200th anniversary of the first steam locomotive
 2005: 400th anniversary of the Gunpowder Plot
 2005: 60th anniversary of the end of the Second World War
 2006: 200th anniversary of the birth of Isambard Kingdom Brunel (2 coins) - Clifton Suspension Bridge and Paddington Station
 2007: 200th anniversary of the Abolition of the Slave Trade
 2007: 300th anniversary of the Acts of Union 1707
 2008: 100th anniversary of the 1908 Summer Olympics in London
 2008: The Beijing Olympics handover to London
 2009: 200th anniversary of the birth of Charles Darwin
 2009: 250th anniversary of the birth of Scottish poet Robert Burns
 2010: 100th anniversary of the death of Florence Nightingale
 2011: 400th anniversary of the King James Bible.
 2011: 500th anniversary of the Mary Rose
 2012: 200th anniversary of the birth of Charles Dickens
 2012: The London Olympics handover to Rio
 2013: The 150th anniversary of the London Underground (2 coins) - Roundel and Train
 2013: The 350th anniversary of the first minting of the Golden guinea
 2014: 100th anniversary of the Outbreak of the First World War
 2014: 500th anniversary of Trinity House
 2015: 800th anniversary of the Magna Carta
 2015: The Royal Navy
 2016: 400th anniversary of the death of William Shakespeare (3 coins) - Comedy, History, Tragedy
 2016: The Army
 2016: 350th anniversary of the Great Fire of London

Non-circulating 
 2017: First World War Aviation
 2017: 200th anniversary of the death of Jane Austen
 2018: 200th anniversary of Mary Shelley's Frankenstein; or, The Modern Prometheus
 2018: 250th anniversary of Captain Cook's Voyage of Discovery (1st coin)
 2018: 100th anniversary of the World War One Armistice
 2018: 100th anniversary of the Royal Air Force (5 coins) - Badge, Vulcan, Spitfire, Sea King, Lightning II
 2019: 75th anniversary of D-Day
 2019: 260th anniversary of Wedgwood
 2019: 250th anniversary of Samuel Pepys' final diary entry
 2019: 250th anniversary of Captain Cook's Voyage of Discovery (2nd coin)
 2020: 75th anniversary of Victory in Europe Day
 2020: 400th anniversary of the Mayflower voyage
 2020: 100th anniversary of Agatha Christie's first book
 2020: 250th anniversary of Captain Cook's Voyage of Discovery (3rd coin)
 2021: 75th anniversary of the death of H. G. Wells
 2021: 250th anniversary of the birth of Sir Walter Scott
 2022: Dame Vera Lynn
 2022: 150th anniversary of the FA Cup
 2022: 100th anniversary of the death of Alexander Graham Bell
 2023: 50th anniversary of the death of JRR Tolkien
 2023: 100th anniversary of the Flying Scotsman

References

Sources
 Royal Mint website

United Kingdom